Chandan Chakraborty is a Professor of Electrical Engineering at the Indian Institute of Technology Kharagpur, India. He was named Fellow of the Institute of Electrical and Electronics Engineers (IEEE) in 2015 for contributions to estimation techniques and control of induction machine and drive systems.

References

External links

20th-century births
Living people
Indian electrical engineers
Academic staff of IIT Kharagpur
Fellow Members of the IEEE
Year of birth missing (living people)
Place of birth missing (living people)